Mittermeier's sportive lemur (Lepilemur mittermeieri) is a sportive lemur endemic to the Ampasindava Peninsula in Madagascar.

References

Sportive lemurs
Mammals described in 2006